Shalianbao Township (Mandarin: 沙连堡乡) is a township in Hualong Hui Autonomous County, Haidong, Qinghai, China. In 2010, Shalianbao Township had a total population of 4,106: 2,061 males and 2,045 females: 1,353 aged under 14, 2,493 aged between 15 and 65 and 260 aged over 65.

References 

Township-level divisions of Qinghai
Haidong